Thomas Ménagé (born 6 January 1991) is a French politician, lawyer and activist. He is a Member of the National Assembly for Loiret's 4th constituency since 2022.

Ménagé was a member of Debout la France before founding his own political movement L'Avenir Français (The French Future). During the 2022 French legislative election, he formed an alliance with the National Rally and contested the election on their ticket.

He has also been the deputy mayor of Ouchamps since 2020.

Biography

Early life
Ménagé grew up in Loir-et-Cher. He completed his secondary studies at the Lycée de Pontlevoy. He then obtained a law degree from the University of Tours in 2013 and a master's degree in public law from the Sorbonne University in 2015. After graduating he worked in property law and as a construction and real-estate manager.

Debout la France
Politically, Ménagé identifies himself as a Gaullist. He initially supported the Union for a Popular Movement before joining Debout la France in 2014. He served as chief of staff to Nicolas Dupont-Aignan and as a managing director of Debout la France from 2017 to 2019. In the second round of the 2017 French presidential election he facilitated the negotiation of agreements between Nicolas Dupont-Aignan and Marine Le Pen in which Le Pen would appoint Aignan as Prime Minister should she win the election.

L'Avenir Français and National Rally
Ménagé resigned from Debout la France citing strategic disagreements between him and the party leadership. He founded a new conservative movement The French Future (L'Avenir Français) with other former Debout la France members which he claimed would be conceptionally close to the ideas of the National Rally.

In 2020, he was appointed the deputy mayor of Ouchamps and sits on the town planning committee. the 2021 French regional elections he was elected as a regional councilor in Loiret.

During the 2022 French legislative election, he was announced as the candidate for Loiret's 4th constituency and would stand affiliated to the National Rally's ticket despite not being a full member of the party. He was elected deputy in the second round with 63.36% of the vote against the NUPES candidate from the French Communist Party.

References

1991 births
Living people
National Rally (France) politicians
21st-century French politicians
Deputies of the 16th National Assembly of the French Fifth Republic
21st-century French lawyers
Pantheon-Sorbonne University alumni
University of Tours alumni
Regional councillors of France
French political party founders
Members of Parliament for Loiret